Jamill or Jamille is a given name. Notable people with the given name include:

Jamill Kelly (born 1977), American wrestler
Jamill Smith (born 1991), American football player
Jamille Matt (born 1990), Jamaican footballer
Jamille Bittar, Malian politician

See also
Jamil